The 1929 Ice Hockey European Championship was the 14th edition of the ice hockey tournament for European countries associated to the International Ice Hockey Federation .

The tournament was played between January 28, and February 3, 1929, in Budapest, Hungary, and Czechoslovakia won their fifth title.  Three groups of three were to play with the second place team in each group going to the second round, the first place team going directly to the semi-finals.  The first place team in the second round would then become the fourth semi-finalist.  Finland withdrew leaving the first group with only two teams.

First round

Group A

January 30

Standings Group A

Group B

January 28

January 29

January 30

Standings Group B

Group C

January 28

January 29

January 30

Standings Group C

Second round

January 31

February 1

February 1

Standings Second Round

Semifinals

February 1

February 2

Third place match

February 3

Final

February 3

Top goalscorers

Ulrich Lederer (Austria), 6 goals

References
 Euro Championship 1929

1929
Ice Hockey European Championships
1928–29 in Hungarian ice hockey
1920s in Budapest
International sports competitions in Budapest
January 1929 sports events
February 1929 sports events